Disorder and Early Sorrow is a 1925 novella written by Thomas Mann. It follows the fortunes of the Cornelius family through the perspective of Abel Cornelius (written in a third person narrative voice), a 47-year-old professor at the local university, whose status in society was once highly respected but has diminished markedly. The Cornelius family is, in part, a reflection of Mann's own family. The novella explores the psychological and social impact of the Weimar Hyperinflation. It first appeared in a Festschrift celebrating Mann's 50th birthday in the publication Neue Rundschau. It first appeared in English in The Dial in two installments in 1926 (October and November). In book form, it was translated into English by Helen Tracy Lowe-Porter in 1929 and by Herman George Scheffauer in 1930. It was translated in 2023 by Damion Searls as "Chaotic World and Childhood Sorrow".

Plot summary
The novella is set in one day in Munich in Weimar Germany. The Cornelius family are preparing a party for Ingrid and Bert, Professor Cornelius's children. The family are divided up on the basis of chronology, foreshadowing one of the central themes of the work which is the interplay between different generations at a time of dislocating social and economic change. Ingrid and Bert, both adolescents, are "the big folk"; Professor Cornelius and his wife are "the old folk"; Ellie and Snapper, their youngest children, are "the little folk"; and Professor Cornelius's parents, who are only discussed and who do not feature directly in the story, are categorised as "the ancients".

Film version
A West German film adaptation  was released in 1977, directed by Franz Seitz.

References

German novels adapted into films
Novellas by Thomas Mann
Works about the Weimar Republic
1925 German-language novels
1925 German novels